Copper(II) oxide or cupric oxide is an inorganic compound with the formula CuO.  A black solid, it is one of the two stable oxides of copper, the other being Cu2O or copper(I) oxide (cuprous oxide).  As a mineral, it is known as tenorite.  It is a product of copper mining and the precursor to many other copper-containing products and chemical compounds.

Production
It is produced on a large scale by pyrometallurgy, as one stage in extracting copper from its ores. The ores are treated with an aqueous mixture of ammonium carbonate, ammonia, and oxygen to give copper(I) and copper(II) ammine complexes, which are extracted from the solids.  These complexes are decomposed with steam to give CuO.

It can be formed by heating copper in air at around 300–800°C:
 2 Cu + O2 → 2 CuO
For laboratory uses, pure copper(II) oxide is better prepared by heating copper(II) nitrate, copper(II) hydroxide, or basic copper(II) carbonate:  
 2 Cu(NO3)2(s) → 2 CuO(s)  + 4 NO2(g)  + O2(g)  (180°C)
 Cu2(OH)2CO3(s) → 2 CuO(s) + CO2(g) + H2O(g)
 Cu(OH)2(s) → CuO(s) + H2O(g)

Reactions
Copper(II) oxide dissolves in mineral acids such as hydrochloric acid, sulfuric acid or nitric acid to give the corresponding copper(II) salts:
 CuO + 2 HNO3 → Cu(NO3)2 + H2O
 CuO + 2 HCl → CuCl2 + H2O
 CuO + H2SO4 → CuSO4 + H2O

It reacts with concentrated alkali to form the corresponding cuprate salts:

 2 MOH + CuO + H2O   →   M2[Cu(OH)4]

It can also be reduced to copper metal using hydrogen, carbon monoxide, or carbon:
 CuO + H2   →   Cu + H2O
 CuO + CO   →   Cu + CO2
 2 CuO + C   →   2Cu + CO2
When cupric oxide is substituted for iron oxide in thermite the resulting mixture is a low explosive, not an incendiary.

Structure and physical properties
Copper(II) oxide belongs to the monoclinic crystal system. The copper atom is coordinated by 4 oxygen atoms in an approximately square planar configuration.

The work function of bulk CuO is 5.3 eV

Uses
As a significant product of copper mining, copper(II) oxide is the starting point for the production of other copper salts. For example, many wood preservatives are produced from copper oxide.

Cupric oxide is used as a pigment in ceramics to produce blue, red, and green, and sometimes gray, pink, or black glazes.  

It is incorrectly used as a dietary supplement in animal feed. Due to low bioactivity, negligible copper is absorbed.

It is used when welding with copper alloys.

A copper oxide electrode formed part of the early battery type known as the Edison–Lalande cell. Copper oxide was also used in a lithium battery type (IEC 60086 code "G").

Pyrotechnics and fireworks

Used as moderate blue coloring agent in blue flame compositions with additional chlorine donors and oxidizers such as chlorates and perchlorates. Providing oxygen it can be used as flash powder oxidizer with metal fuels such as magnesium, aluminium, or magnalium powder. Sometimes it is used in strobe effects and thermite compositions as crackling stars effect.

Similar compounds
An example of natural copper(I,II) oxide is the mineral paramelaconite, Cu+2Cu2+2O3.

See also
Patina

References

External links

National Pollutant Inventory - Copper and compounds fact sheet
 Copper oxides project page
CDC - NIOSH Pocket Guide to Chemical Hazards

Copper(II) compounds
Semiconductor materials
Pyrotechnic colorants
Transition metal oxides
Glass dyes